Krüger, Krueger or Kruger (without the umlaut Ü) are German surnames originating from Krüger, meaning tavern-keeper in Low German and potter in Central German and Upper German, both associated with the Germanic word wikt:Krug, "jug".

The last name Krüger with umlaut dots is widespread in Germany with some 155,000 people bearing this last name, whereas the form without umlaut dots is widespread in South Africa with some 65,000 people, in the US with some 20,000 people and in Brazil with some 14,000 people. In all other countries both forms have less than 5,000 people bearing it.

Notable people with the surname include:

People
 Adalbert Krueger (1832–1896), German astronomer
 Alan Krueger (1960–2019), American economist
 Alex Kruger (born 1963), English Olympic decathlete
 Alma Kruger (1871–1960), American stage and film actress
 Anne Osborn Krueger (born 1934), American economist
 Anton Robert Krueger (born 1971), South African writer
 Barbara Kruger (born 1945), American conceptual artist
 Bernhard Krüger (1904–1989), German SS officer and counterfeiter 
 Bob Krueger (1935-2022), American politician
 Bradley Kruger (born 1988), Dutch cricketer
 Carl Kruger (born 1949), American politician
 Clifford Krueger (1918–1988), American politician
 David Michael Krueger (born Peter Woodcock; 1939-2010), Canadian serial killer, rapist, and necrophile
 Debbie Kruger (born 1962), Australian writer
 Diane Kruger (born 1976), German-American model and actress
 Erwin Krüger (1915–1973), Nicaraguan singer and poet
 Felix Krueger (1874–1948), German psychologist and philosopher
 Frantz Kruger (born 1975), South African discus thrower
 Franz Krüger (1797–1857), German painter of equestrian portraits
 Fred Kruger, born Johan Friedrich Carl Kruger, (1831–1888) was a German-born Australian photographer
 Friedrich-Wilhelm Krüger (1894–1945), Nazi official
 Garnett Kruger (born 1977), South African cricketer
 Gottfried Krueger, founder of the Gottfried Krueger Brewing Company of Newark, New Jersey, US
 Hans Krüger (1902–1971), German politician
 Hardy Krüger (1928–2022), German actor
 Harvey M. Krueger (1929-2017), former CEO of Kuhn, Loeb & Co. and vice chairman of Lehman Brothers
 Helen Barbara Kruger (1913–2006), American businesswoman
 Heli Koivula Kruger (born 1975), Finnish track and field athlete
 Jack Kruger (born 1994), American baseball player
 Jbe' Kruger (born 1986), South African golfer
 Jeffrey Kruger (1931–2014), British entertainment business executive
 Jim Krueger, American comic book writer and novelist
 Jimmy Kruger (1917–1987), South African minister of justice and the police
 Joseph Kruger ( 1869–1927), American-Canadian businessman
 Kandace Krueger (born 1976), Miss USA 2001
 Karl-Heinz Krüger (born 1953), German boxer
 Karl Wilhelm Krüger (1796–1874), German Hellenist
 Karoline Krüger (born 1970), Norwegian singer-songwriter and pianist
 Kelly Kruger (born 1982), Canadian actress
 Leondra Kruger (born 1976), Associate Justice of the California Supreme Court
 Liz Krueger (born 1957), American politician
 Lon Kruger (born 1952), American college basketball coach
 Louis Krüger (born 1996), German politician
 Luise Krüger (1915–2001), German javelin athlete
 Maynard C. Krueger (1906–1991), American politician and academic
 Michael Krüger (footballer) (born 1954), German footballer and manager
 Mitchell Krueger (born 1994), American tennis player
 Myron W. Krueger (born 1942), American computer artist and pioneer in the fields of virtual and augmented reality
 Otto Kruger (1885–1974), American actor
 Paul Kruger (1825–1904), President of South Africa, and namesake of 
 Kruger House
 Kruger National Park
 Krugerrand
 Krugersdorp - town in Gauteng province
 Peter Krüger, or Peter Crüger (1580–1639), German mathematician, astronomer and polymath
 Rayne Kruger (1922-2002), South African author
 Rich Krueger (born 1960), American singer-songwriter and neonatologist 
 Rick Krueger (born 1949), American politician
 Sebastian Krüger (born 1963), caricaturist
 Sonia Kruger (born 1965), Australian television presenter
 Vanessa Krüger (born 1991), German actress
 Walter Krueger (1881–1967), US Army general
 Walter Krueger (1892-1973), German general
 Werner Krüger (1910–2003), German engineer

Fictional characters 
 Agent Kruger, from the American dystopian film Elysium
 Anubis "Doggie" Cruger, from the American television series Power Rangers S.P.D.
 Biscuit Krueger, from the anime and manga series Hunter x Hunter
 Eren Kruger, from the anime and manga series Attack on Titan
 Doggie Kruger, from the tokusatsu series Tokusou Sentai Dekaranger
 Fanzell Kruger, from the anime and manga series Black Clover
 Freddy Krueger, the main antagonist from the American slasher series A Nightmare on Elm Street
 H. Maximillian Kruger, from the space combat series Wing Commander
 Herbie Kruger, a spy in John Gardner's novels.
 Mr. Kruger, George Costanza's boss from the American sitcom Seinfeld
 Natsuki Kruger, a character from the manga and anime My Otome 
 Victor Kruger, from the British fantasy-action film Highlander
 Sebastian Kruger ( Head of Coalescence ) from Call Of Duty Black Ops 3.

See also 
 Krugerrand
 Kruger National Park
 Battle at Kruger, the video footage.
 Kruger 60, a star in the constellation Cepheus
 Kruger Inc.
 Kreuger
 Cruger (disambiguation)
 Kluger (disambiguation)
 Dunning–Kruger effect

Notes

References

German-language surnames
Jewish surnames
Afrikaans-language surnames
Occupational surnames